The Youth's Companion Building is a historic building at 209 Columbus Avenue in Boston, Massachusetts. The building is also known as the Pledge of Allegiance Building because the Pledge of Allegiance was written and published there. The building originally had the address 201 Columbus Avenue and also has the address 142 Berkeley Street.  It was built in 1892 and added to the National Register of Historic Places in 1974.

It housed the offices of The Youth's Companion, the magazine owned and edited by Daniel Ford that promoted the Pledge of Allegiance. Ford built the building for The Youth's Companion and moved the magazine's headquarters there in 1892, where it remained until 1915, when the magazine moved to a new building near the current Boston University.

The architects, Henry W. Hartwell and William Cummings Richardson, also designed a number of other buildings in the Boston area, notably the Belmont Town Hall and Christ Church, Andover.

When used by The Youth's Companion, the first floor of the building held the business office, correspondence department, subscription and advertising departments with Ford's office in the back.  The third floor held the premium department, packing and mailing room, and stitching machines.  The fifth floor contained the editorial offices, art department and library that had an encyclopedic collection of clippings from over 200 magazines from around the world.  The press room was in the basement along with the presses, collators, steam tubular boilers for power binding equipment and two dynamos which generated electricity for lighting.

See also 
 National Register of Historic Places listings in northern Boston, Massachusetts

References

Commercial buildings completed in 1892
Buildings and structures in Boston
Office buildings on the National Register of Historic Places in Massachusetts
Pledge of Allegiance
National Register of Historic Places in Boston
Hartwell and Richardson buildings